Diplomate of National Board (DNB) is a Post-graduate Master's degree same as MD/MS degree awarded to the Specialist Doctors in India after completion of three year residency. DNB courses are run and the degrees are awarded by the National Board of Examinations (NBE), New Delhi, an autonomous academic body under the Ministry of Health and Family Welfare, Government of India on successful completion of their postgraduate residency. People who completed an MD/MS program in their respective subjects are also eligible to appear in the final DNB certification exam along with regular DNB trainees. 

Doctorate of National Board (DrNB) is a post MD/MS/DNB super speciality degree awarded by NBE. It is equivalent to Doctorate of Medicine (DM)Master of Chirurgiae (MCh) degrees awarded respectively in medical and surgical super specialities.

In 1975, the Government of India established the National Board of Examinations, an autonomous organisation Ministry of Health and Family Welfare, with the prime objective of conducting postgraduate and postdoctoral courses of high and uniform national standard in various disciplines of modern medicine and allied sciences on an All-India single point entrance basis. The Board conducts its postgraduate and postdoctoral programmes in reputed government, trust and private teaching hospitals at various cities and towns after accreditation by the board and in medical colleges accredited by the Medical Council of India.

Recognition of DNB qualifications 

The degrees are recognised by the Government of India and a Gazette order is published for the same. Also, the Ministry of Health and Family Welfare has issued a notification mentioning that DNB should always be considered equivalent to MD/MS.

The name of the degree awarded by the National Board of Examinations is called "Diplomate of National Board" (DNB). The list of recognised qualifications awarded by the Board in various broad and super specialties as approved by the Government of India are included in the first schedule of the Indian Medical Council Act, 1956.
 
 
The DNB qualifications awarded by the National Board of Examinations have been equated with postgraduate and postdoctoral qualifications awarded by other Indian universities for all purposes, including appointment to teaching posts.

List of broad specialties for DNB 
Three-year postgraduate residency programme is available in the following broad specialties:

01. Anaesthesiology,
02. Anatomy,
03. Biochemistry,
04. Dermatology,
05. Emergency medicine,
06. Family Medicine,
07. Field Epidemiology
08. Forensic Medicine,
09. General Medicine,
10. General Surgery,
11. Health Administration (including Hospital Administration),
12. Immunohematology & Transfusion Medicine,
13. Maternal and Child Health,
14. Microbiology,
15. Nuclear Medicine,
16. Obstetrics and Gynaecology,
17. Ophthalmology,
18. Orthopedic Surgery,
19. Otorhinolaryngology,
20. Paediatrics,
21. Pathology,
22. Pharmacology,
23. Physical Medicine and Rehabilitation,
24. Physiology,
25. Psychiatry,
26. Radio Diagnosis,
27. Radiation Oncology
28. Respiratory Diseases,
29. Rural Surgery,
30. Social and Preventive Medicine.

List of super specialties for DNB - Now Doctorate of National Board (DrNB) 
Three-year residency programme is available in the following super-specialties:

Medical super-specialties
Cardiac Anaesthesia
Cardiology
Clinical Pharmacology
Critical Care Medicine
Endocrinology
Gastroenterology
Haematology
Medical Genetics
Medical Oncology
Neonatology
Nephrology
Neurology
Neuro anaesthesia & Critical Care 
Paediatric Cardiology
Rheumatology

Surgical super-specialties
 Cardio Thoracic Surgery (Inc. Direct 6-yr course)
 Genito Urinary Surgery
 Neurosurgery (Inc. Direct 6-yr course)
 Paediatric Surgery (Inc. Direct 6-yr course)
 Peripheral Vascular Surgery
 Plastic Surgery (Inc. Direct 6-yr course)
 Surgical Gastroenterology
 Surgical Oncology
 Thoracic surgery. 
 The terminology of Diplomate of National Board (DNB) for super speciality courses has been changed to Diplomate of National Board (DNB) by the NBE in its recent notification. [5]

List of subspecialties for FNB 
The National Board of Examinations also runs Postdoctoral fellowship programme in select subspecialties. On successful completion of  two-year residency, candidates are awarded Fellow of National Board (FNB).

Fellowship programme is available in the following subspecialties:
 Arthroplasty 
 Breast imaging 
 Hand & Micro Surgery
 Maternal and Foetal medicine
 Infectious Diseases
 Interventional Cardiology
 Laboratory Medicine
 Liver Transplantation
 Minimal Access Surgery
 Neurovascular intervention 
 Paediatric Gastroenterology
 Paediatric Haemato Oncology
 Paediatric Nephrology
 Pain medicine 
 Reproductive Medicine
 Spine Surgery
 Sports Medicine
 Trauma & Acute Care surgery
 Vitreo-Retinal Surgery

References 
5. https://natboard.edu.in/viewNotice.php?NBE=RUJFa1NvbmFwTVdwaG1vbGJnKzJzZz09 

6. http://www.natboard.edu.in/matter.php?notice_id=1408

External links
Official Site

Medical education in India
Ministry of Health and Family Welfare